The Essential Cyndi Lauper is a compilation by American pop singer Cyndi Lauper. It was released as part of Sony BMG's The Essential series in 2003. The album has sold 15,000 copies in the United States, according to Nielsen SoundScan.

Five years after its initial release, Sony Music Entertainment Japan reissued the album accompanied with bonus DVD which features four music videos. The expanded edition debuted at the number 29 on the Japan's Oricon, and became her eighth top-40 charting album in the country.

Track listing

Original release (2003)
 "Girls Just Want to Have Fun" (Robert Hazard) – 3:55 (from She's So Unusual 1983)
 "Money Changes Everything" (Tom Gray) – 5:03 (from She's So Unusual 1983)
 "Who Let in the Rain"  (Cyndi Lauper, Allee Willis) – 4:37 (from Hat Full Of Stars 1993)
 "She Bop" (Lauper, Gary Corbett, Rick Chertoff, Stephen Broughton Lunt) – 3:48 (from She's So Unusual 1983)
 "Time After Time" (Lauper, Rob Hyman) – 4:01 (from She's So Unusual 1983)
 "I Drove All Night" (Billy Steinberg, Tom Kelly) – 4:12 (from A Night To Remember 1989)
 "Hat Full of Stars" (Lauper, Nicky Holland) – 4:28 (from Hat Full Of Stars 1993)
 "Change of Heart"  (Lauper, Essra Mohawk) – 4:25 (from True Colors 1986)
 "Sisters of Avalon" (Lauper, Jan Pulsford) – 4:22 (from Sisters Of Avalon 1996)
 "All Through the Night"  (Jules Shear) – 4:29 (from She's So Unusual 1983)
 "When You Were Mine" (Prince) – 5:03 (from She's So Unusual 1983)
 "True Colors" (Steinberg, Kelly) – 3:48 (from True Colors 1986)
 "Unhook the Stars" (Lauper, Pulsford) – 3:58 (from Sisters Of Avalon 1996)
 "The Goonies 'R' Good Enough (Single Version)" (Lauper, Broughton Lunt, Arthur Stead) – 3:38 (Meant for True Colors 1986 but left off, Put On Goonies Soundtrack 1985)

Additional tracks on Japanese editions
 "Hey Now (Girls Just Want to Have Fun)"  (Lolly Vegas, Hazard, Lauper*) – 3:53 (from 12 Deadly Cyns & Then Some 1994)
 "Set Your Heart" (Victor Carstarphen, Lauper, Gene McFadden, Richard Morel, John Whitehead) – 3:43 (2008 reissue only) (from Bring Ya To The Brink 2008)

Exclusive track on 2007 Wal-Mart edition
 "Shine" (Lauper, William Wittman) (from shine 2004)

Bonus DVD on 2008 Japanese reissue

 "Girls Just Want to Have Fun" (Hazard, Lauper*) (from She's So Unusual 1983)
 "Time After Time" (Lauper, Hyman) (She's So Unusual 1983)
 "True Colors" (Steinberg, Kelly) (from True Colors 1986)
 "I Drove All Night" (Steinberg, Kelly) (from A Night To Remember 1989)

Chart positions

References

Cyndi Lauper compilation albums
2003 greatest hits albums
2008 video albums
Music video compilation albums
2008 greatest hits albums
Epic Records compilation albums